tert-Butyl hypochlorite is the organic compound with the formula (CH3)3COCl. A yellow liquid, it is a rare example of an organic hypochlorite, i.e. a compound with an O-Cl bond. It is a reactive material that is useful for chlorinations.  It can be viewed as a lipophilic version of sodium hypochlorite (bleach).

Synthesis and reactions
It is produced by chlorination of tert-butyl alcohol in the presence of base:

tert-Butyl hypochlorite is useful in the preparation of organic chloramines:
R2NH  +  t-BuOCl  →  R2NCl  +  t-BuOH

References

Hypochlorite esters
Tert-butyl compounds